Vaughtia is a genus of sea snails, marine gastropod mollusks in the family Muricidae, the murex snails or rock snails.

Species
Species within the genus Vaughtia include:

 Vaughtia babingtoni (G.B. Sowerby III, 1892)
 Vaughtia dawnbrinkae Lussi, 2012 
 Vaughtia dunkeri (Krauss, 1848)
 Vaughtia fenestrata (Gould, 1860)
 Vaughtia gruveli (Dautzenberg, 1910)
 Vaughtia hayesi (Lorenz, 1995)
 Vaughtia jucunda (Thiele, 1925)
 Vaughtia olivemeyerae Lussi, 2012 
 Vaughtia parvifusus Lussi, 2012 
 Vaughtia purpuroides (Reeve, 1845)
 Vaughtia scrobiculata (Dunker, 1846)
 Vaughtia squamata Houart, 2003
Synonyms
 Vaughtia transkeiensis (Houart, 1987): synonym of Gemixystus transkeiensis (Houart, 1987)

References

 Lussi M. (2012) Description of three new species of Vaughtia from off the Eastern Cape, South Africa with a revision of the genus (Gastropoda: Prosobranchia: Muricidae) from Southern Madagascar. Malacologia Mostra Mondiale 76: 5-13. [July 2012]

External links
 Houart R. (1995) Pterymarchia n. gen. and Vaughtia n. gen., two new muricid genera (Gastropoda: Muricidae: Muricinae and Ocenebrinae). Apex 10(4): 127-136. [20 December 1995 page(s): 128]
 Houart, R. (2003). Two new muricids (Gastropoda: Muricidae) from west Africa. Novapex. 4 (2-3): 51-56
 Barco, A.; Herbert, G.; Houart, R.; Fassio, G. & Oliverio, M. (2017). A molecular phylogenetic framework for the subfamily Ocenebrinae (Gastropoda, Muricidae). Zoologica Scripta. 46 (3): 322-335

Ocenebrinae